Following are the results of the 2004 Copa Aerosur, the Bolivian football tournament held in La Paz, Cochabamba and Santa Cruz, sponsored by AeroSur airline.

The 2004 tournament started in January and ended in February.  The 12 teams from the top division qualified for the first stage.

First round

|}

Second round

|}

Third round

|}

Bracket

 Note that 5 best loser qualified for this round.

Semi-final

|}

Final

2004 domestic association football cups
2004
2004 in Bolivian football